Andronymus is an Afrotropical genus of grass skippers in the family Hesperiidae.

Species
Andronymus bjornstadi Congdon, Kielland & Collins, 1998
Andronymus caesar (Fabricius, 1793)
Andronymus evander (Mabille, 1890)
Andronymus fenestrella Bethune-Baker, 1908
Andronymus fontainei T.B. Larsen & Congdon, 2012
Andronymus gander Evans, 1947
Andronymus helles Evans, 1937
Andronymus hero Evans, 1937
Andronymus marcus Usher, 1980
Andronymus marina Evans, 1937
Andronymus neander (Plötz, 1884)

References

Natural History Museum Lepidoptera genus database

External links
Andronymus at Markku Savela's Lepidoptera and Some Other Life Forms
Seitz, A. Die Gross-Schmetterlinge der Erde 13: Die Afrikanischen Tagfalter. Plate XIII 79

Erionotini
Hesperiidae genera